Start Music is a 2019 Indian Tamil-language Musical reality show that airs on Star Vijay and digitally streams on Disney+ Hotstar. The show has had three seasons with Priyanka Deshpande has continued as a host for two seasons and Ma Ka Pa Anand has as a host for third season. The first season was premiered on 26 May 2019.

Series overview

Season 1
The first season aired  from 26 May 2019 to 10 November 2019 and ended with 24 Episodes. The show was hosted by Priyanka Deshpande.

Season 2
The second Season of Start Music started on 16 August 2020 and finished on 25 April 2021 on Star Vijay and was telecast on every Sunday. Priyanka Deshpande return as the hosts for this season. Soppana Sundaries won the title of Start Music 2.

Season 3
The third Season of Start Music started on 10 October 2021 and finished on 17 April 2022. The show was hosted by Ma Ka Pa Anand. Raja Rani 2 serial won the title of Start Music 3.

Season 4
The fourth season of Start Music, It is scheduled to premiere in the first half of 2023. Priyanka Deshpande return as the hosts for this season.

Adaptations

References

External links
 Start Music at Disney+ Hotstar

Star Vijay original programming
Tamil-language television shows
Tamil-language musical television series
Tamil-language quiz shows
Tamil-language reality television series
2019 Tamil-language television series debuts
2020 Tamil-language television seasons
2021 Tamil-language television seasons
Television shows set in Tamil Nadu
2023 Tamil-language television seasons